JustShareIt was a peer-to-peer car rental and car sharing marketplace. It allowed individuals to rent vehicles directly from individual car owners or car sharing companies in local neighborhood locations.

Acquisition
JustShareIt was launched on January 5, 2012. It was acquired by Fox Rent a Car in March, 2017.

See also
Car rental
Car Sharing
Peer-to-peer carsharing

References

External links
Official Website
Motorhome & Car Rentals
Rambling Rover Campervans

Carsharing
Plug-in hybrid vehicles
Car rental companies of the United States
Transport companies established in 2012
American companies established in 2012
Technology companies established in 2012
Peer-to-peer